William Ros, 2nd Baron Ros of Helmsley (c. 1285 – 3 February 1343) was the son of William Ros, 1st Baron Ros and Maud de Vaux.

Biography
As 2nd Baron Ros of Helmsley, Werke, Trusbut & Belvoir, he was summoned to Parliament during the reigns of Edward II and Edward III of England. In 1321 he completed the religious foundation which his father had begun at Blakeney. He was created Lord Ross of Werke. He was appointed Lord High Admiral and was one of the commissioners with the Archbishop of York, and others, to negotiate peace between the king and Robert de Bruce, who had assumed the title of king of Scotland.

William Ros was buried at Kirkham Priory, near the great altar.

Family
William Ros married, before 25 November 1316, Margery Badlesmere (c.1306 – 18 October 1363), eldest daughter of Bartholomew Badlesmere, 1st Baron Badlesmere, with Margaret, daughter of Sir Thomas de Clare, with whom he had two sons and three daughters:

William, who succeeded his father as Baron.
Thomas, who succeeded his brother as Baron.
Margaret, who married Sir Edward de Bohun.
Maud, who married John de Welles, 4th Baron Welles.
Elizabeth, who married William la Zouche, 2nd Baron Haryngworth.

Maud survived her husband by many years and was one of the very few English people present at the Jubilee, at Rome, in 1350; the king had tried to prevent the attendance of his subjects at this ceremony on account of the large sums of money usually taken out of the kingdom on such occasions.

References

External links
 Inquisition Post Mortem #474, dated 1343.

Bibliography

1280s births
1343 deaths
14th-century English people
02
Lord High Admirals of England
Year of birth uncertain